Acrobasis epaxia is a species of snout moth in the genus Acrobasis. It was described by Alfred Jefferis Turner in 1947, and is known from Australia.

References

Moths described in 1947
Acrobasis
Moths of Australia